Colinas de Solymar is a small town and northern suburb of Ciudad de la Costa in the Canelones Department of southern Uruguay.

Population
In 2011 Colinas de Solymar had a population of 2,813.

Source: Instituto Nacional de Estadística de Uruguay

Street map

References

External links
INE map of Solymar, Lomas de Solymar and Colinas de Solymar

Ciudad de la Costa